The Tongue River is a  tributary of the Pembina River in northeastern North Dakota in the United States. It drains an area of the prairie country near the Canada–US border in the extreme northeast corner of the state in the watershed of the Red River.

It rises in eastern Cavalier County and flows in a direct course east-northeast into Pembina County, passing the towns of Cavalier, Neche and Bathgate.

Upstream of Cavalier, the river passes through Icelandic State Park, where Renwick Dam causes it to form Lake Renwick.  Below the dam, foot trails follow the river in the Gunlogson Arboretum Nature Preserve.

See also
List of North Dakota rivers

References

External links

Icelandic State Park website
Gunlogson Arboretum Nature Preserve website

Bodies of water of Cavalier County, North Dakota
Bodies of water of Pembina County, North Dakota
Rivers of North Dakota
Tributaries of Hudson Bay